Viola mirabilis is a species of flowering plant belonging to the family Violaceae.

It is native to temperate areas of Eurasia.

References

mirabilis